The 1958 British West Indies Championships was the second edition of the track and field competition between British colony nations in the Caribbean. A total of eighteen events were contested, all of them by men – women's events were not added until the following year.

George de Peana of British Guiana defended his 5000 metres/10,000 metres double from the previous edition. Trinidadian sprinters Hendrickson Harewood and Clifton Bertrand also defended their titles in the 100 metres and 200 metres, respectively. Betrand added the 400 metres title to his 200 m to become the first person to win two different sprint events at the competition.

The Trinidad and Tobago national championships were not held that year, as the country's governing body focused on hosting the wider regional tournament. The host nation topped the medal table at the competition, winning ten of the eighteen events on offer. Jamaica came second, with four gold medals, followed by British Guiana on three. William Gittens's gold for Grenada in the 400 metres hurdles made his country's first medallist at the championships, and also the first winner from outside of the three aforementioned nations.

Medal summary

References

Medallists
British West Indies Championships. GBR Athletics. Retrieved on 2015-03-21.

British West Indies Championships
British West Indies Championships
British West Indies Championships
British West Indies Championships
International athletics competitions hosted by Trinidad and Tobago
Sport in Port of Spain
20th century in Port of Spain